The Croatia Open (currently sponsored by Plava laguna) is a men's ATP tennis tournament held in Umag, Croatia that is part of the 250 series of the ATP Tour.

The tournament began in 1990 when it was part of Yugoslavia, and is the oldest tennis tournament in Croatia. It began as the Yugoslav Open and has been played every year since. It is played on outdoor red clay courts. Carlos Moyá has won the tournament a record five times; he also holds the record for the most consecutive wins at three. His most recent win was in 2007. In 2016, the centre court stadium was named after Croatian tennis player Goran Ivanišević.

Past finals

Singles

Doubles

See also
 Zagreb Indoors
 Bol Open
 Makarska International Championships
 Zagreb Open

External links

Official Croatia Open website
ATP tournament profile

 
Tennis tournaments in Croatia
Clay court tennis tournaments
Croatia
Recurring sporting events established in 1990
Summer events in Croatia
1990 establishments in Croatia